Pomeys is a commune in the Rhône department in eastern France.

History
The legend traces the origins of the parish of St Martin de Pomeys (village name) to the life of the great apostle of the French countryside: St. Martin. Returning from his homeland of Hungary, the bishop of Tours would have stopped at the inexhaustible fountain known as the "fountain St Martin". He would have left there, engraved on the stone, the mark with his stick. This fountain is located on the "raitchemin de St Martin" on the way to the bois de Pomeys.

See also
Communes of the Rhône department

References

Communes of Rhône (department)